Orbix is a CORBA ORB (Object Request Broker) – a software product from Micro Focus (originally from IONA Technologies, then Progress Software, eventually acquired by Micro Focus in December 2012) which helps programmers build distributed applications. Orbix is an implementation of the OMG's (Object Management Group) CORBA Specification.

External links
Orbix product page

References

Common Object Request Broker Architecture
Micro Focus International
Trinity College Dublin